Cremenciug may refer to:

Cremenciug, Căuşeni, a commune in Căuşeni district, Moldova
Cremenciug, Soroca, a commune in Soroca district, Moldova
Kremenchuk, an industrial city in Poltava oblast, Ukraine